Vanessa de Lisle is a British fashion journalist. She was fashion editor for Harpers & Queen for 12 years, and then worked for British Vogue.

As a representative of Harpers & Queen, she was the fashion journalist asked to choose the Dress of the Year for 1981, for which she picked a printed silk dress by Karl Lagerfeld at Chloé, with shoes by Walter Steiger and a chunky necklace by Ugo Correani.

In 1996, de Lisle was a consultant on fashion for the House of Fraser chain. As of the 2010s she is working as a stylist and fashion consultant.

References

Living people
British women journalists
English fashion journalists
British magazine editors
Fashion editors
Harper's Bazaar
Date of birth missing (living people)
Women magazine editors
Year of birth missing (living people)